Khandaghosh Assembly constituency is an assembly constituency in Purba Bardhaman district in the Indian state of West Bengal. It is reserved for scheduled castes.

Overview
As per order of the Delimitation Commission, No. 259 Khandaghosh (SC) assembly constituency covers Khandaghosh community development block and Adra, Bhuri, Gohogram, Khano, Maszidpur, Sanko and Satinadi gram panchayats of Galsi II CD Block.

Khandaghosh assembly constituency is part of No. 37 Bishnupur (Lok Sabha constituency).

Members of Legislative Assembly

Election results

2021

2016

2011
In the 2011 elections, Nabin Chandra Bag of CPI(M) defeated his nearest rival Alok Kumar Majhi of Trinamool Congress.

.# Swing calculated on Congress+Trinamool Congress vote percentages taken together in 2006.

1977-2006
Prasanta Majhi of the CPI (M) won the Khandaghosh (SC) assembly seat in 2006 defeating his nearest rival Biswanath Roy of Trinamool Congress. Contests in most years were multi cornered but only winners and runners are being mentioned. In 2001, Jyotsna Singha of CPI (M) defeated Banshi Badan Roy of Trinamool. In 1996, 1991 and 1986 Shiba Prasad Dalui of CPI (M) defeated Basudev Mandal, Sankar Nath Maji and Pramatha Dhibar, all of Congress, in the respective years. In 1982 and 1977, Purna Chandra Malik of CPI (M) defeated Manoranjan Pramanik of Congress.

1951-1972
Monoranjan Pramanik of Congress won the seat in 1972. In 1971, the seat was won by Purna Chandra Malik of CPI (M). Gobardhan Pakray of Samyukta Socialist Party won it in 1969. P. Dhibar of Congress won the seat in 1967. Jaharlal Banerjee of Congress won it in 1962. Khandaghosh constituency was not there in 1957 and in 1951 it was a general constituency. It was won by Jb Md Hossain of Congress.

References

Politics of Paschim Bardhaman district
Assembly constituencies of West Bengal
Politics of Purba Bardhaman district